Wind power in Lithuania is a form of renewable energy in Lithuania. At the end of 2011, wind power capacity in Lithuania was 179 MW and the wind energy share of total electricity consumption was 3,8%. At the end of 2019, wind power capacity in Lithuania was 546 MW and the wind energy share of total electricity consumption was 13%.

Statistics
Installed wind power capacity in Lithuania and generation in recent years is shown in the table below:

See also
 Energy in Lithuania
 Renewable energy in Lithuania
 Solar power in Lithuania
 Renewable energy by country

References

External links

 
Lithuania